Parc is a 2008 French drama film directed by Arnaud des Pallières. The film is based on John Cheever's 1969 novel Bullet Park. The film stars Sergi López, Jean-Marc Barr and Geraldine Chaplin. The film had its international premiere at the 2008 Toronto International Film Festival on 11 September.

Plot
Georges Clou (Lopez) is a successful salesman, enjoying the fruits of his labour as a resident of an exclusive gated community in the French Riviera. His life is seemingly idyllic, a beautiful home, a loving wife and a son. Appearances are deceptive as this idyllic vision is spoiled by the traumas his teenage son endures. Elsewhere in the community, Paul Marteau (Barr), arrives with a troubled past and uncertain future.

Cast
Sergi López as Georges Clou
Jean-Marc Barr as Paul Marteau
Geraldine Chaplin as La mère de Marteau 
Nathalie Richard as Hélène Clou 
Laurent Delbecque as Toni Clou
Delphine Chuillot as Evelyn Marteau
Jean-Pierre Kalfon as Le propriétaire 
László Szabó as Le guérisseur Balthazar Rutuola

Production
For the adaptation, the filmmaker transported the script from the United States to the French Riviera, with most of the action taking place around Nice.

Reception
Positif described the film as "a curious fusion between the world of Chabrol and Lynch that awakens a riot of empathic anti-establishment feeling".

References

External links
 

2000s French-language films
French drama films
2008 films
2008 drama films
Films based on American novels
Films directed by Arnaud des Pallières
2000s French films